Tanegashima Tokitaka (1528 – October 21, 1579) was a Japanese daimyō of the Sengoku period, the 14th head of the Tanegashima clan. He is known for having first established contact with the Europeans, and producing the first European type firearms of Japan.

Early life 
Tokitaka was born in 1528, the son of Tanegashima Satotoki (種子島恵時), a retainer of daimyō Shimazu Takahisa. Tokitaka was a father in law of Shimazu Yoshihisa. He became head of the Tanegashima clan when his father abdicated.

Contact with Europeans 
In 1543, a ship transporting Portuguese sailors arrived near Tanegashima island. The Europeans were brought to Tokitaka, who was only 15 years old, and demonstrated in front of him the use of arquabus firearms. Lord Tanegashima Tokitaka instructed his swordsmith, Yaita Kinbei Kiyosada (八板金兵衛清定), to create functional replicas of the objects, the first ever Japanese-made. The smith (Yaita) did not have much of a problem with most of the gun but "drilling the barrel helically so that the screw (bisen bolt) could be tightly inserted" was a major problem as this "technique did not apparently exist in Japan until this time."

The following year, a Portuguese blacksmith was brought back to Japan and the problem solved.

Tanegashima Tokitaka, quickly acquired the methods of producing firearms and gunpowder. Due to Tanegashima's role in the spread of firearms, firearms were colloquially known as "Tanegashima (gun)" in Japan.
Tanegashima Tokitaka was reported to have constantly practiced with the firearm.

Siege of Kajiki 
The Siege of Kajiki was fought in the year of 1549 when forces of the Shimazu clan besieged the castle of Kajiki in Ōsumi Province. The siege succeeded and the castle was taken. Shimazu vassal, Ijuin Tadaaki used a gun given by Tanegashima Tokitaka. The siege is notable for Shimazu Takahisa made use of European arquebuses, being the first time "Portuguese derived" arquebuses were used in battle in Japan.

Death 
Lord Tokitaka died in October 21, 1579.

References

People of Sengoku-period Japan
Daimyo
1528 births
1579 deaths
Shimazu clan